1P-ETH-LAD (1-propionyl-6-ethyl-6-nor-lysergic acid diethylamide) is an analog of LSD. 1P-ETH-LAD is a psychedelic drug similar to LSD. Research has shown formation of ETH-LAD from 1P-ETH-LAD incubated in human serum, suggesting that it functions as a prodrug. It is part of the lysergamide chemical class. Like ETH-LAD, this drug has been reported to be significantly more potent than LSD itself, and is reported to largely mimic ETH-LAD's psychedelic effects.

1P-ETH-LAD has little history of human usage before January 2016.

Legal issues 
 United States: 1P-ETH-LAD may be considered illegal in the U.S. for human consumption under the Federal Analogue Act.

 United Kingdom: It is illegal to produce, supply, or import this substance under the Psychoactive Substance Act, which came into effect on May 26th, 2016.

See also 
 Research chemical
 Designer drugs
 1P-AL-LAD

References 

Designer drugs
Entheogens
Lysergamides
Serotonin receptor agonists